Indiana gained two seats in reapportionment following the 1820 United States Census, and elected its members August 5, 1822.

Indiana's single at-large seat in the 17th Congress was empty at the time of the election, previous incumbent William Hendricks (Democratic-Republican) having resigned to run for Governor of Indiana. Jonathan Jennings (Jackson Democratic-Republican), elected to the new , was elected in the ensuing special election to fill the at-large district for the remainder of the 17th Congress.

See also 
 1822 Indiana's at-large congressional district special election
 1822 and 1823 United States House of Representatives elections
 List of United States representatives from Indiana

1822
Indiana
United States House of Representatives